Agios Floros is a village and a community in the municipal unit of Arfara, Messenia, southern Greece. The community consists of the villages Agios Floros and Christofilaiika. It is located on the National Road 7 Kalamata - Corinth, about 20 km north of Kalamata. The population of the community was 226 in 2011, of which 195 in Agios Floros proper and 31 in Christofilaiika.

See also
List of settlements in Messenia

References

Populated places in Messenia